This article details the Warrington Wolves rugby league football club's 2015 season. This was the Wolves 20th season in the Super League.

Pre season friendlies

Warrington score is first.

World Club Series

Table

Regular Season

Super 8's

2015 fixtures and results

2015 Super League Fixtures

2015 Super 8's

Player appearances
Super League Only

 = Injured

 = Suspended

Challenge Cup

Player appearances
Challenge Cup Games only

2015 squad statistics

 Appearances and points include (Super League, Challenge Cup and Play-offs) as of 24 September 2015.

 = Injured
 = Suspended

2015 transfers in/out

In

Out

References

External links
Warrington Wolves Website
Warrington Wolves - SL Website

Warrington Wolves seasons
Warrington Wolves season